Maksim Alekseyevich Shumailov (born 2 May 1990) is a Russian football goalkeeper.

Career
Shumailov made his professional debut for Amkar on 15 July 2009 in the Russian Cup game against FC Avangard Kursk.

External links
 
 
 

1990 births
Living people
Russian footballers
Russia youth international footballers
Russia under-21 international footballers
Association football goalkeepers
FC Amkar Perm players
FC Tyumen players
FC Nizhny Novgorod (2015) players
FC Zvezda Perm players